No. 260 Squadron RAF was a Royal Air Force squadron formed as a reconnaissance and anti–submarine unit in World War I and a fighter unit in World War II.

History

Formation and World War I
No. 260 Squadron Royal Air Force was formed on 25 July 1918 and operated DH.6s from Westward Ho!, Devon on anti-submarine patrols and disbanded on 5 March 1919.

Reformation in World War II
The squadron reformed on 22 November 1940 at RAF Castletown, Scotland and operated Hawker Hurricanes. It then moved to Egypt and operated Curtiss Kittyhawk fighter bombers over the western desert. The squadron then advanced with the Eighth Army into Tunisia.  With the North African Campaign over it then moved to Sicily following Operation Husky. As the allied forces advanced into Italy it converted to the North American P-51 Mustang and it disbanded at Lavariano on 19 August 1945. Among notable squadron personnel was the future actor Christopher Lee, who served as an intelligence officer.

Aircraft operated

2012 aircraft recovery in Egypt
In May 2012, CNN reported a Polish oil company worker in Egypt discovered a crash-landed 260 Sqn P-40 aircraft presumably piloted by Flt Sgt Dennis Copping, who went missing on 28 June 1942 and was never heard from again. Copping was part of a two plane formation flying defective aircraft from the landing ground at Biur el Baheira to 53RSU, a Recovery & Service Unit at Wadi Natruna. Copping became disorientated while ferrying the P-40 and flew in the wrong direction; evidence at the crash site indicates Copping survived the landing. Since no remains were evident near the Kittyhawk, it seems likely that Copping wandered off into the desert in a desperate and ultimately futile attempt to reach help. British authorities hoped to bring the remarkably well-preserved plane back to the RAF Museum in London, but these plans fell through. Instead the plane was given a cosmetic restoration and displayed at the El Alamein Military Museum.

References

External links

 History of No.'s 256–260 Squadrons at RAF Web
 260 Squadron history on the official RAF website

260
Military units and formations established in 1918
1918 establishments in the United Kingdom
Military units and formations in Mandatory Palestine in World War II